Bradley Klahn and Peter Polansky were the defending champions but chose not to defend their title.

Grégoire Barrère and Quentin Halys won the title after defeating Romain Arneodo and Hugo Nys 6–4, 6–1 in the final.

Seeds

Draw

References

External links
 Main draw

BNP Paribas Primrose Bordeaux - Doubles
2019 Doubles